Edward O'Neill (12 October 1862 – 20 August 1938)  was a British actor.

He was born Edward Alfred Morse Becher in Solapur, British Raj and died at age 75 in Twickenham, Middlesex, England, UK.

Selected filmography
 Henry VIII (1911)
 The Ring and the Rajah (1914)
 The King's Daughter (1916)
 A Fair Impostor (1916)
 The Manxman (1916)
 Sally in Our Alley (1916)
 Justice (1917)
 Everybody's Business (1917)
 A Fortune at Stake (1918)
 The Great Impostor (1918)
 The Wages of Sin (1918)
 Her Heritage (1919)
 Darby and Joan (1920)
 Duke's Son (1920)
 Enchantment (1920)
 The Mirage (1920)
 The Barton Mystery (1920)
 General John Regan (1921)
 Innocent (1921)
 Guy Fawkes (1923)
 One Arabian Night (1923)
 The Scandal (1923)
 Don Quixote (1923)
 The Sins Ye Do (1924)
 Not for Sale (1924)
 The Conspirators (1924)
 A Romance of Mayfair (1925)
 Sahara Love (1926)
 The Flight Commander (1927)
 Boadicea (1927)
 Dawn (1928)
 A Daughter in Revolt (1928)
 Chick (1928)
 Lily of Killarney (1929)
 Alf's Carpet (1929)
 The Bondman (1929)

References

External links
 

1862 births
1938 deaths
English male film actors
English male silent film actors
20th-century English male actors
People from Solapur
20th-century British male actors